Theodore Spencer (1902–1949) was an American poet and academic.

Life
He graduated from Princeton University in 1923, and a Ph.D from Harvard University in 1928.  He then taught there, from 1927 to 1949. He was appointed lecturer in English literature at Cambridge University, England, in 1939. In 1942, Spencer gave the Lowell lectures on Shakespeare, published as Shakespeare and the Nature of Man, his most important work. Spencer also published essays, short stories, and poetry.

His notebook is at Princeton University, and papers are at Harvard University.

Awards
 Golden Rose Award

Works

Poetry

Essays

References

1902 births
1949 deaths
Princeton University alumni
Harvard University alumni
Harvard University faculty
20th-century American poets